The Virginian is the 1997 debut studio album by American vocalist Neko Case, whose backing band at that time consisted of a rotating group of musicians referred to as "Her Boyfriends". It was Case's first solo record after previously being a member of Vancouver pop punk bands Maow and Cub.

Guest musicians on the album include Carl Newman, Carolyn Mark, Rose Melberg, Matt Murphy, Brian Connelly, and Darryl Neudorf. Case and Newman would later form The New Pornographers with other Vancouver musicians.

The song "Karoline" was a re-recording of the song "Rebecca Lash" which Case had written and recorded with her previous band Maow. "Misfire" is a cover of a Queen song, originally recorded on the band's Sheer Heart Attack album. A video for "Timber" was shot; however, CMT did not air it, calling it too dark. Case herself was unhappy with the video and did not want it aired.

Track listing
 "Timber" – 2:45 (Neko Case, Brad Lambert, Eric Napier)
 "Bowling Green" – 2:16 (Terry Slater, Jacqueline Ertel)
 "Jettison" – 3:13 (Case, Ford Pier)
 "High on Cruel" – 2:02 (Case, David Carswell)
 "Karoline" – 2:24 (Case, Carswell)
 "Lonely Old Lies" – 3:34 (Case, Lambert, Napier, Carl Newman)
 "Honky Tonk Hiccups" – 2:22 (Matt Murphy)
 "The Virginian" – 3:29 (Case, Lambert, Napier, Newman)
 "Duchess" – 2:55 (Scott Engel)
 "Thanks a Lot" – 2:35 (Eddie Miller, Don Sessions)
 "Somebody Led Me Away" – 2:46 (Lola Jean Dillon)
 "Misfire" – 2:10 (John Deacon)

References

1997 debut albums
Neko Case albums
Mint Records albums
Bloodshot Records albums